Nebria schwarzi is a species of ground beetle in the family Carabidae. It is found in North America.

Subspecies
These three subspecies belong to the species Nebria schwarzi:
 Nebria schwarzi beverlianna Kavanaugh, 1979
 Nebria schwarzi dyke
 Nebria schwarzi schwarzi Van Dyke, 1925

References

Further reading

 

schwarzi
Articles created by Qbugbot
Beetles described in 1925